Jorge Telch (born 22 November 1942) is a Mexican diver. He competed in the men's 3 metre springboard event at the 1968 Summer Olympics.

At the 1969 Maccabiah Games in Israel, he won two gold medals in diving, including in men's highboard.

References

External links
 

1942 births
Living people
Mexican male divers
Mexican Jews
Olympic divers of Mexico
Divers at the 1968 Summer Olympics
Divers from Mexico City
Male high divers
Jewish sportspeople
Jewish sportspeople by nationality
Maccabiah Games gold medalists for Mexico
Competitors at the 1969 Maccabiah Games
Maccabiah Games medalists in swimming